The Kiryati Brigade (the 4th Brigade in the 1948 Arab-Israeli war) was formed in 1948 by David Ben-Gurion and was one of the original nine brigades that made up the Haganah. The Kiryati Brigade was initially responsible for securing the area in and around Tel Aviv. The brigade participated in several battles during the 1948 Arab-Israeli war, and also played a role in the Suez War.

Three of its original battalions were:

 42nd battalion 
 43rd battalion (commanded by Amos Ben-Gurion, the son of David Ben-Gurion)
 44th battalion

List of Israeli military operations that the Kiryati Brigade participated in
 Operation Danny
 Operation Hametz
 Suez War

See also
 List of battles and operations in the 1948 Palestine war

External links and references
 http://www.globalsecurity.org/military/world/israel/4th_brigade_kiryati.htm

Brigades of Israel
1948 Arab–Israeli War
Military units and formations established in 1948